Salifou Lindou (born in 1965 in Foumban, Cameroon) is a self-taught artist who lives and works in Douala.

Bibliography
 Africanh (2014). Salifou Lindou. http://africanah.org/salifou-lindou/
 Contemporary African Art Fair. Salifou Lindou http://1-54.com/london/artists/salifou-lindou/
 Enough Room for Space. Salifou Lindou http://www.enoughroomforspace.org/?news=salifou-lindou
 Africultures. Salifou Lindou http://www.africultures.com/php/?nav=personne&no=24084
 Salifou Lindou http://www.gueststudio.com/2011/12/gueststudio-3-salifou-lindou-cm.html
 L'ivresse du Papillon, p. 40 à 53, Lionnel Manga, édition Artistafrica
 Pensa, Iolanda (Ed.) 2017. Public Art in Africa. Art et transformations urbaines à Douala /// Art and Urban Transformations in Douala. Genève: Metis Presses.

References

Cameroonian artists
1965 births
Living people